Ellis Foree Powers (March 2, 1906 – December 2, 1983) was an American right fielder in Major League Baseball who played for the Cleveland Indians in 1932 and 1933. He also managed in the minor leagues from 1939 to 1942.

Born in Toddspoint, Kentucky, he died at age 77 in Louisville, Kentucky.

External links

1906 births
1983 deaths
Major League Baseball right fielders
Cleveland Indians players
Baseball players from Kentucky
Minor league baseball managers
Jackson Senators players
New Orleans Pelicans (baseball) players
Oakland Oaks (baseball) players
Toledo Mud Hens players
Louisville Colonels (minor league) players
Shreveport Sports players
Knoxville Smokies players
Huntington Boosters players
Bowling Green Barons players
Hot Springs Bathers players
Hartford Bees players